Khalil Caraballo (born 3 January 1999) is an Argentine professional footballer who plays as a forward for Guillermo Brown.

Career
Caraballo spent four years of his youth career with Gimnasia y Esgrima, having signed from Deportivo La Dulce in 2015. He was promoted into Gimnasia's first-team squad for the 2019–20 season, initially featuring in pre-season when he scored against Everton and Fénix. His first experience of senior football arrived on 31 August 2019, as he was selected as a substitute for a Primera División fixture away from home against Argentinos Juniors. Darío Ortiz substituted him on after sixty-five minutes for Claudio Spinelli, though the forward would depart seven minutes later after receiving a straight red card from referee Facundo Tello.

On 16 August 2020, Caraballo signed for Guillermo Brown.

Career statistics
.

References

External links

1999 births
Living people
Sportspeople from Buenos Aires Province
Argentine footballers
Association football forwards
Argentine Primera División players
Torneo Argentino A players
Club de Gimnasia y Esgrima La Plata footballers
Juventud Unida de Gualeguaychú players
Guillermo Brown de Puerto Madryn footballers